Buenavista is a municipality in the Mexican state of Michoacán.

Political entity

The municipality  is located in the west of the state,  from the state capital of Morelia. The seat is Buenavista Tomatlán, with a population of about 8,500 people. This seat serves as the local government for the entire territory, with a municipal president, a syndic, and 7 representatives called regidors. Other principal communities include Carillo Puerto, Santa Ana Amatlán, Pizándaro and 18 de Marzo. The main economic activities of the municipalities are farming and ranching.

Geography and environment
Notable elevations include the hills called Zirapatiro, Del Azucar, Felipe Catlan, Los Osotes and Polon. This river accounts for most of the municipality's surface water, with the rest provided by springs and streams. The climate is tropical with temperatures that range between 18 and 36 degrees C. It is relatively dry, with rains in the summer. Annual average rainfall is 745.2mm.

The ecosystem is dominated by tropical deciduous forest, with species such as pine and oak in the higher elevations along with kapok, parota, tepeguaje, mango and zapote (Diospyros digyna and Casimiroa edulis). There are also areas of tropical spiny brush. Typical fauna includes species such as cacomistle, skunks, squirrels, coyotes, foxes, Eurasian sparrowhawk, doves and other birds.

History
The name means "good view" in Spanish. Its original name was Tomatlán Buenavista, with the first name from Nahuatl meaning "place of tomatoes". The area was first formally settled by the Mexicas during the pre Hispanic period, but its population was mixed with those of the Purhepecha and Pirinda ethnicities. This community was located just north of the current municipal seat, which is now an archeological site at a ranch called Pueblo Viejo. After the Spanish Conquest, the location of the current town of Buenavista began as a hacienda. After Independence, it came under the control of the municipality of Apatzingán. The current municipality was formed in 1927, taking land from the municipalities of Apatzingán and Tancítaro, with the seat named Buenavista Tomatlán.

References

Municipalities of Michoacán
1927 establishments in Mexico